Annamaria Baudena (born 1963) is an Italian ski mountaineer and long-distance runner. She also competes in bicycle races.

Selected results 
 2001:
 1st, Dolomiti Cup team (together with Bice Bones)
 3rd, Transacavallo (together with Christiane Nex)
 9th, World Championship team race (together with Bice Bones)
 2004:
 3rd, World Championship relay race (together with Christiane Nex and Gloriana Pellissier)
 6th, World Championship vertical race
 2006:
 2nd, Kappa Marathon
 3rd, Ötzi Alpin Marathon relay race (together with Petra Dibiasi and Waltraud Untersteiner)

References 

1963 births
Living people
Italian female ski mountaineers